Ruuttu is a Finnish surname. Notable people with the surname include:

Alexander Ruuttu (born 1992), American-born Finnish ice hockey player, son of Christian
Christian Ruuttu (born 1964), Finnish ice hockey scout and player

See also
Ruutu

Finnish-language surnames